The Perry Twins may refer to:

 Alan and Michael Perry, miniature wargaming sculptors (also known as the Perry Brothers)
 The Perry Twins (duo), a Los Angeles-based DJ/dance music producer duo